Europa is Covenant's third album. It was released on May 26, 1998, by 21st Circuitry. Tracks such as "Leviathan" and "Go Film" remain popular favourites and are played often by the band. Both were recorded live on 2007's In Transit live album. "Go Film" was also released on the Euro EP along with "Tension". The album peaked at No. 101 on the CMJ Radio Top 200 while reaching No. 3 on the CMJ RPM chart.

Track listing

References

1998 albums
Covenant (band) albums
21st Circuitry albums
Metropolis Records albums